Andrew Robertson Leslie was a Scottish amateur footballer who played as a wing half in the Scottish League for Queen's Park.

Personal life 
As of 1911, Leslie was an apprentice engineer. Leslie served as a lance corporal in the Highland Light Infantry during the First World War and was wounded in August 1916. He was later commissioned as a second lieutenant in the London Regiment.

Career statistics

References

1892 births
Scottish footballers
Scottish Football League players
British Army personnel of World War I
People from Govan
Association football wing halves
Queen's Park F.C. players
Date of death missing
Highland Light Infantry soldiers
London Regiment officers
Scottish engineers
Military personnel from Glasgow